Wayne G. Popham (born October 23, 1929) is an American politician in the state of Minnesota. He served in the Minnesota State Senate from 1963 to 1972 (district 35).

References

1929 births
Living people
Minnesota state senators
Lawyers from Minneapolis
Politicians from Minneapolis
People from Codington County, South Dakota